The fourth round of the women's scratch race of the 2007–08 UCI Track Cycling World Cup Classics took place in Copenhagen, Denmark on 15 February 2008.

Competition format
A scratch race is a race in which all riders start together and the object is simply to be first over the finish line after a certain number of laps. There are no intermediate points or sprints.

The tournament consisted of two qualifying heats of 7.5 km (30 laps). The top twelve cyclist of each heat advanced to the 10 km final (40 laps).

Schedule
Friday 15 February
16:15-16:35 Qualifying
20:00-20:20 Final
20:45-20:50 Victory Ceremony

Schedule from Tissottiming.com

Results

Qualifying

Qualifying Heat 1

Qualifying Heat 2

Results from Tissottiming.com.

Final

Results from Tissottiming.com.

World Cup Standings
Final standings after 4 of 4 2007–08 World Cup races.

Results from Tissottiming.com.

See also
 2007–08 UCI Track Cycling World Cup Classics – Round 4 – Women's individual pursuit
 2007–08 UCI Track Cycling World Cup Classics – Round 4 – Women's points race
 2007–08 UCI Track Cycling World Cup Classics – Round 4 – Women's team pursuit

References

2007–08 UCI Track Cycling World Cup Classics
2008 in Danish sport
UCI Track Cycling World Cup – Women's scratch